Patrick Arthur Saindon is a former professional American football player who played offensive lineman for three seasons for the New Orleans Saints and Atlanta Falcons.

References

1961 births
Sportspeople from Nice
American football offensive guards
Birmingham Stallions players
Atlanta Falcons players
New Orleans Saints players
Vanderbilt Commodores football players
Living people
French players of American football
National Football League replacement players